Lexington Community Unit School District 7 is a unified school district in
Lexington, Illinois, United States.  All three of its school levels (grade, junior high, and high school) are one campus.

Junior high
Extra-cirrcicular activities in junior high include Builders Club and Math Team.   Sports are boys baseball, girls basketball, boys basketball, cheerleading, girls volleyball, and boys and girls track.

See also
 Lexington High School (Illinois) — high school program at Lexington Schools
 John A. Sterling — Lexington superintendent 1881–1883; Congressman 1903–1913 and 1915–1918

References

External links
 

School districts in Illinois
Education in McLean County, Illinois